Unione Sportiva Dilettantistica Rivarolese 1906 was an Italian association football club located in Rivarolo Canavese, Piedmont. It last played in Serie D. Its colors were maroon, white and black, and it was founded in 1906.

Rivarolese was promoted from Regional Eccellenza league in 2005/2006, after having won its round. In 2009 it was merged with Chieri of Piedmont (which finished 13th in 2008–09 Eccellenza Piedmont A) and transferred to Chieri.

The side is not to be confused with another Rivarolese, which played in the Italian Championship first league between the first and second World Wars: that team was based in Rivarolo Ligure, a suburb of Genoa.

External links
 Rivarolese page @ Serie-D.com

Defunct football clubs in Italy
Association football clubs established in 1906
Association football clubs disestablished in 2009
Football clubs in Piedmont and Aosta Valley
Province of Turin
1906 establishments in Italy
2009 disestablishments in Italy
Rivarolo Canavese